Quinty Ton (born 4 August 1998) is a Dutch professional racing cyclist, who currently rides for UCI Women's Continental Team .

References

External links

1998 births
Living people
Dutch female cyclists
Place of birth missing (living people)
People from Tiel
Cyclists from Gelderland
21st-century Dutch women